Takeshi Aono (青野 毅, born January 12, 1983, in Bonotsu, Kagoshima) is a Japanese former professional baseball infielder for the Chiba Lotte Marines in Japan's Nippon Professional Baseball. He  played in 2002, and from 2006 to 2007 and from 2010 to 2012.

External links

NPB

1983 births
Living people
Japanese baseball players
Baseball people from Kagoshima Prefecture
Nippon Professional Baseball infielders
Chiba Lotte Marines players